The Bangkok Thailand Temple is an announced temple of the Church of Jesus Christ of Latter-day Saints (LDS Church) under construction in Bangkok, Thailand.

History
The intent to construct the temple was announced by church president Thomas S. Monson on April 5, 2015, during the Sunday morning session of the church's general conference. The Abidjan Ivory Coast and Port Au Prince Haiti temples were announced at the same time.

On January 26, 2019, a groundbreaking to signify beginning of construction was held, with Robert C. Gay presiding.

The temple is expected to be completed in 2023. Delays are expected in response to the coronavirus pandemic.

See also

 The Church of Jesus Christ of Latter-day Saints in Thailand
 Comparison of temples of The Church of Jesus Christ of Latter-day Saints
 List of temples of The Church of Jesus Christ of Latter-day Saints
 List of temples of The Church of Jesus Christ of Latter-day Saints by geographic region
 Temple architecture (Latter-day Saints)

References

External links
Bangkok Thailand Temple Official announcement
Bangkok Thailand Temple at ChurchofJesusChristTemples.org

Temples (LDS Church) in Asia
Proposed religious buildings and structures of the Church of Jesus Christ of Latter-day Saints
The Church of Jesus Christ of Latter-day Saints in Thailand
Religious buildings and structures in Bangkok
Proposed buildings and structures in Thailand
21st-century Latter Day Saint temples